Fosterville is a rural locality in the City of Greater Bendigo in the Australian state of Victoria. The Fosterville mine was opened in 2005 and is operated by Kirkland Lake Gold.

History
It was founded in 1852 as Ellesmere when gold was discovered. In 1894 it was renamed Fostervile after Henry Foster, the minister for mines.  A school was opened in 1898 and closed in 1953.

References 

Bendigo
Towns in Victoria (Australia)
Suburbs of Bendigo